Mario Taddei (born September 28, 1972) is an Italian academic. He is an expert in multimedia and edutainment for museums, a Leonardo da Vinci devotee and scholar, and an expert in the codexes and machines of da Vinci and ancient books of technology.

Biography 
Born in Bologna, Italy, Taddei graduated in Industrial Design, Politecnico di Milano. He has headed many projects about innovative installations for museums. He has been studying da Vinci for years and has coauthored new discoveries.

In 2008, he studied for the first time in depth The Book of Secrets (Kitab al-Asrar) by the 1000 CE Arabic engineer and scientist Ibn Khalaf al-Muradi. The complete and unique study of all The Book of Secrets, all his machines and the pages are shown in the Museum of Islamic Art in Doha.

He is the author of many books. His book "Leonardo's Machines: Da Vinci's Inventions Revealed" was translated into 20 languages.

Work

The robot of Leonardo

Among the vast number of projects of Leonardo, there is a “mechanical knight”  that has entered into the common imagination. In 1957 Carlo Pedretti was the first person to discover it, hidden amongst da Vinci’s countless designs. The mechanical knight was again mentioned in 1974, in the Codex Madrid edited by Ladislao Reti. Nevertheless, there was no attempt to reconstruct it until 1996. It was then that Mark Rosheim published an independent study of the robot, followed by a joint enterprise with the Florence Institute and Museum of the History of Science which mounted an exhibition with an entire section dedicated to Rosheim’s research on the subject. However, it was only in 2002 that Rosheim built a complete physical model for a BBC documentary. Since then, many exhibitions and museums of da Vinci’s models have included a soldier on wheels labeled, “Leonardo’s robot”.

Studies on the subject mention that manuscripts relating to Leonardo’s idea for the robot are in the Codex Atlanticus, specifically folio 579r. Mario Taddei's further research has indicated folios 1077r, 1021r and 1021v as possible sources for the mechanisms of this mysterious humanoid robot.

In the 2007 Mario Taddei made a new research on the original documents of Leonardo finding new pieces of information to build a new model of the soldier robot, correctly related to the drawings of Leonardo. This robot was designed just for defensive purpose, not for war or theater and his movement are related to the arms that move right and left with a rope.
The Model is shown in exhibition around the world and the work of research is published in the "Leonardo da Vinci's robots" book.

Interviews
Da Vinci's Lost Code - Discovery Channel - 2006.
Da Vinci Code - NBC Nightly NEWS - 2006 video.

Books
Taddei Mario, Edoardo Zanon: "Creare videogiochi ". Ed. Jackson Libri 2002. 300 p. 
Taddei, E. Zanon, Bernardoni: "Leonardo, Water and the Renaissance ". Ed. Federico Motta 2004. 120 pp. 
Taddei, E. Zanon, Laurenza: "Leonardo's Machines. Secrets and Inventions in the Da Vinci Codices ". Ed. Giunti Editore 2005. 240 pp. 
Taddei, E. Zanon, Laurenza: "Leonardo's Machines: Da Vinci's Inventions Revealed ". David & Charles PLC 2006. 240 pp. 
Taddei, E. Zanon, Lisa: "Leonardo da Vinci's Codex Atlanticus". Ed. Leonardo3 2005. 144 p. 
Taddei, E. Zanon, Pinotti: "Rappresentazioni Grafiche". Ed. Atlas 2005. 336 p. 
Taddei, E. Zanon, Bernardoni: "Leonardo bridges". Ed. Leonardo3 2005. 144 p. 
Taddei, E. Zanon, Lisa: "Leonardo's workshop". Ed. Leonardo3 2006. 160 p. 
Taddei Mario: "Las maquinas de Leonardo". Ed. Leonardo3 2006. 160 p. 
Taddei Mario: "Машины Леонардо да Винчи. Тайны и изобретения в рукописях ученого". Ed. Ниола-Пресс 200t. 
Taddei, E. Zanon, Lisa: "The Book of Secrets (Kitab al-Asrar)". Ed. Leonardo3 2007. 420 p. 
Taddei Mario: "Da Vinci 's Robots. Self-propelling cart". Ed. Leonardo3 2008. 480 p.+16 p. )
Taddei Mario: "Da Vinci 's Robots. New mechanics and new automata found in codices". Ed. Leonardo3 2008. 480 p. 
Taddei Mario: "Atlas ilustrado de las máquinas de Leonardo secretos e invenciones en los Códices da Vinci". Ed. Susaeta 2009. 480 p. 
Taddei Mario: "Illustrated Atlas of Leonardo’s Robots La mecanica y los nuevos automatia encontrados en los codices ". Ed. Susaeta 2009. 480 p. 
Taddei Mario "The Last Supper. Secrets, techniques and errors of a masterpiece as never seen before". Ed. Leonardo3 2007. 420 p. 
Taddei Mario "圖解達文西機器人". Ed. 出版日期 2010. 300p. 
Taddei Mario "Secret Note of Leonardo da Vinci – 다빈치의 비밀노트". Ed. UNJUNSA 2017. 300 p. 
Taddei Mario, Paolo Mosca: "LEONARDO DA VINCI È MORTO! Come fare soldi con l’ARTE DIGITALE e gli NFT". Ed. Amazon 2021. 204 p. 
Taddei Mario, Paolo Mosca: "LEONARDO DA VINCI IS DEAD - How to make money with DIGITAL ART and NFT". Ed. Amazon 2021. 188 p. 
Taddei Mario, "LEONARDO DA VINCI & LA REALTA’ VIRTUALE DALLA GIOCONDA AL METAVERSO". Ed. Amazon 2021. 190 p. 
Taddei Mario, "LEONARDO DA VINCI & VIRTUAL REALITY - FROM MONA LISA TO THE METAVERSE". Ed. Amazon 2021. 190 p. 
Taddei Mario, "I ROBOT E L'ANDROIDE DI LEONARDO DA VINCI". Ed. Amazon 2021. 170 p. 
Taddei Mario, "THE ROBOTS AND ANDROID OF LEONARDO DA VINCI". Ed. Amazon 2021. 170 p.

References

External links

Leonardo3 Leonardo da Vinci works
Leonardo's car discover
Leonardo's robots

Living people
1972 births
Academic staff of the Polytechnic University of Milan